Florina-Cristina Burcea-Zamfir (née Zamfir; formerly Florianu; born 29 September 1989) is a Romanian handballer who plays for SCM Craiova.

She was given the award of Cetățean de onoare ("Honorary Citizen") of the city of Craiova in 2018.

International honours 
EHF Cup: 
Winner: 2018

Individual awards 
 Top Scorer of the EHF Cup: 2016 
 Top Scorer of the Bucharest Trophy: 2015
 Top Scorer of the Romanian National League: 2017
 Prosport All-Star Left Back of the Romanian National League: 2017

Personal life
On 31 May 2019, she married her club coach Bogdan Burcea.

References
 

1989 births
Living people
Sportspeople from Slatina, Romania
Romanian female handball players